Party games are games that are played at social gatherings to facilitate interaction and provide entertainment and recreation. Categories include (explicit) icebreaker, parlour (indoor), picnic (outdoor), and large group games. Other types include pairing off (partnered) games, and parlour races. Different games will generate different atmospheres so the party game may merely be intended as an icebreakers, or the sole purpose for or structure of the party. As such, party games aim to include players of various skill levels and player-elimination is rare. Party games are intended to be played socially, and are designed to be easy for new players to learn.

Characteristics
The characteristics of party games tend to include:
 A game can support a relatively large or undefined number of players, compared to more traditional board games or card games that require a small, set number of players. Some games, especially commercial games, have a set limit based on available equipment; others are limited by other mechanics of the game like time for each turn, while still others have no practical limit, like Appyshot App.
 Team-based play in party games is common, but not required. Games that divide players into two, three, or four roughly equal teams, such as Cranium, Charades or Pictionary tend to allow for larger total numbers of players. By contrast, other games such as Werewolf and How to Host a Murder are role-based, with each player being given a character or other role to play in the course of the game. The number of players is limited to the number of roles, but in many such games there are "generic" roles allowing for a high degree of flexibility.
 Cooperation and interaction between players is encouraged. Both team and role-based play generally encourage this social aspect to the game; games that do not encourage this interaction generally make poor party games.
 Multiple ways to play and contribute. For example, in Fictionary not everyone needs to create plausible dictionary definitions; humorous submissions are welcome. In Charades, players can actively participate in guessing without taking a turn at acting. Sports often make poor party games as limitations in a player's physical abilities may preclude participation though some party games, such as: relay racing and Red light/Green light, involve a significant physical aspect and are especially suitable for groups similar in age and ability.
 Players participate in gameplay frequently, sometimes on an impromptu basis. Games in which each player has their own independent turn generally make poor party games, especially if a turn takes a long time.
 A game should also have entertainment value for spectators. Many party games involve at least some level of humor, whether inherent in the game or introduced by players. In this way, players not taking a turn can still enjoy the gameplay, whilst party favors can embellish the party atmosphere.
 Player elimination is rare. Monopoly makes a poor party game, because bankrupt players must sit out while the remaining players continue to the game's conclusion, which can take several hours. In contrast, no matter how far behind a team is in Pictionary, all players can participate until the end.
 The amount of specialized equipment needed is not dependent on the number of players. Games such as Liar's Dice make poor party games because each player needs a cup and five dice to start the game. By contrast, Yahtzee needs only one cup and set of dice regardless of the number of players (the basic Yahtzee game does have other practical limitations).
 The game usually does not involve spending real money as a prerequisite or consequence of playing. Games that require each player to purchase consumable items or specialized equipment are usually poor party games. Casino games are a notable exception. Examples include "casino nights" with a token door charge or buy-in for charity or to defray costs and poker tournaments with a similar small buy-in.

Common party games

 1000 Blank White Cards
 30 Seconds
 Apples to Apples
 Appyshot App
 Articulate
 Bat a rat
 Balderdash
 Bingo
 Beer pong
 Botticelli
 Buck buck
 Cards Against Humanity
 Catch Phrase
 Celebrity
 Charades
 Chinese whispers
 Consequences
 Couch of power
 Dixit
 Drinking games
 Cranium
 Fictionary (related to the commercial Balderdash)
 Game For Fame
 Gift Trap
 Mafia (also known as Vampire or Werewolf)
 Murder mystery games
 Musical statues
 Nerf War
 Never have I ever
 Outburst (game)
 Pictionary
 Post Office (game)
 Psychiatrist
 Scattergories
 Scissors
 Scruples
 Seven minutes in heaven
 Shout about movies
 Song Saga
 Spin the bottle
 Strip games
 Squeak piggy squeak
 Taboo
 The priest of the parish
 The Resistance
 Time's Up! (game)
 Treasure Hunt
 Truth or Dare? and related games such as "Strip or Dare?" and "Drink or Dare?"
 Trip to Jerusalem
 Trivial Pursuit
 Twenty questions
 Utter Nonsense!
 What?
 White elephant gift exchange
 Would you rather
 Zip and bong
 Zip Zap Zop
 Zoom Schwartz Profigliano

Children's party games

Traditional children's party games include:
 Forty forty
 Blind man's bluff
 The Farmer in the Dell
 Hunt the thimble (or slipper, or other object)
 Hide and seek
 Musical chairs
 Musical statues
 Oranges and Lemons
 Pass the parcel
 Pin the tail on the donkey
 Sardines
 Piñata
 Poor pussy
 Wink murder
 Duck, duck, goose
 Sleeping lions
 Mother May I?
 Rock paper scissors
 Twister

Video games

Party video games are commonly designed as a collection of simple minigames, designed to be intuitive and easy to control, and allow for competition between many players. Some, like the Mario Party series and Sonic Shuffle, are played on simulated game boards.

BYTE in 1981 called the Olympic sports game Olympic Decathlon (1980) "the first true party game for microcomputers". Another early example is Starpath's Party Mix.

Large group games

Large group games are played by many participants and are often used as planned activities in structured environments, especially as educational activities. They are similar to party games, except that large group games are typically planned for larger numbers (perhaps even hundreds) as part of an event.

Large group games can take a variety of forms and formats.

Some are physical games such as Buck buck.

Some are modeled on the TV game show format, offering points for teams who can answer questions the fastest. Trivia-type games might have questions posed from the stage and each tabletop writing their answers to be collected and scored. Others may take on some of the qualities of Open Space environments and allow participants to wander in a less structured way.

Some are modeled on TV reality shows such as The Amazing Race or Survivor.  Participants compete as individuals or in teams to complete challenges that move them towards victory in a competition spanning the entire party. The TV shows on which such parties are based are normally competitions involving elimination, so such events require significant planning to avoid exclusion or boredom.

There is also now electronic party games such as Cards Against Humanity or Appyshot App, that can be played on the phone or computer.

Group board games can take on the design of small groups of players, seated at tables of 4 to 6 people, who work together on a problem. There can be large numbers of people (and thus many tables). If properly designed, these scalable exercises can be used for small groups (12 to 20 people) as well as very large events (600 people or 100 tables).

Generally, for these larger exercises, multimedia projectors, large screens and microphones are required for instructions and communications.

A search for team building events can turn up millions of links to exercises, companies, and various offerings ranging from paintball competitions to fire walks to outdoor climbing or whitewater adventures. The impact on actual team building can vary widely - a golf outing for corporate executives does not generally accomplish much in the way of organizational improvement while a business simulation might be directly focused on linking the play of the game to issues for corporate improvement.

Holiday groups use a gift exchange party game such as white elephant gift exchange for socializing and sharing gifts. New online party games, based on these holiday games, allow larger groups to gather on the internet to save travel expenses.

See also

 Drinking game
 Conversation games
 Parlour game
 Pub games
 Minigame
 Casual game
 Cuddle party

References

 
Sports entertainment